Roger Leach (22 April 1948 – 1 December 2001) was an English-Australian actor who played Sgt. Tom Penny in The Bill, and guest starred in Bergerac, Perfect Scoundrels and Doctors.

Early life
Roger was born in Sydney, Australia and read English at Sydney University where he also participated in rowing and other athletics. He won a scholarship to the Central School of Speech and Drama and moved to the UK in 1971. He had many acting roles, including 42 appearances at the Salisbury Playhouse.

Career
Leach became a household name when in 1984 he was asked to become one of the stars in The Bill, a highly successful ITV series about the Metropolitan Police in which he played Sergeant Tom Penny.  He was also a successful stage actor.  In all he played in 42 productions for artistic director David Horlock and four others at the Salisbury Playhouse.  But he also toured around Britain in many productions at local repertory theatres.   Among some outstanding performances he played Lambert le Roux in Pravda to critical acclaim, Rev Hale in Arthur Miller's The Crucible, Ebenezer Scrooge in Charles Dickens' A Christmas Carol, Bluntschi in Arms and the Man, Subtle in The Alchemist, Claudio in William Shakespeare's Measure for Measure, and Colin in Ashes, for which feat of achievement he was cast in The Bill.

Leach appeared in a West End production of Anthony Shaffer's play The Case of the Oily Levantine directed by Patrick Dromgoole, and at the Royal Court in Gimme Shelter.  In later years he featured as Uncle Max in the Sound of Music, Captain Brackett in South Pacific, the Narrator in The Rocky Horror Show, Doolittle in My Fair Lady, and in 2001, Peachum in a tour of The Threepenny Opera.

Leach was also a director, teaching Shakespeare classes in text and audition techniques at three leading drama schools.  He contributed scripts to shows, Moon and Son, Eastenders, and The Bill.  In October 2001, he was reading the Letters of Beethoven with the Sarum Chamber Orchestra and starting rehearsals for The Donkeys Years at the Salisbury Playhouse which was due to open in January 2002.

Leach died at the age of 53 after a four-year battle with cancer.

Filmography

Television

Writer

Theatre

References

1948 births
2001 deaths
20th-century English male actors
21st-century English male actors
English male soap opera actors
Deaths from cancer in England
Male actors from Sydney
University of Sydney alumni
Alumni of the Royal Central School of Speech and Drama
Australian emigrants to the United Kingdom